Richard Edison Uy Yap (born May 18, 1967) is a Filipino actor, singer, model and businessman of Chinese descent. He is best known for portraying Richard "Sir Chief" Lim in Be Careful with My Heart and "Papa Chen" in My Binondo Girl.

Career 
In 2011, Yap launched his acting career in ABS-CBN via My Binondo Girl where he played Kim Chiu's father, Chen Sy.

In 2012, Yap played a recurring character in Walang Hanggan as Henry de Dios. But his role as Richard "Sir Chief" Lim in the daytime drama Be Careful with My Heart catapulted him to fame spreading to other countries and made him a household name. The show ran from 2012 to 2014 due to its large following and loyal fanbase. Be Careful with My Heart would go on to have worldwide tours, concerts, an album, and has been aired in numerous other continents.

After Be Careful with My Heart, Yap starred in Nasaan Ka Nang Kailangan Kita, where his character was paired with Vina Morales, and FPJ's Ang Probinsyano, portraying a criminal underworld character by the name of Philip Tang, and had a special participation in My Super D and Till I Met You.

In 2016, he and Sta. Maria reunited onscreen and topbilled the romantic film The Achy Breaky Hearts which was a box office success. Because of this, there is a strong clamor for them to also reunite on television.

On his singing career, Yap along with Richard Poon collaborated in an album and a major concert.

He topbilled the 2016 installment of Regal Films' Mano Po 7: Chinoy.

On December 16, 2020, he signed his management contract with GMA Artist Center.

Filmography

Television

Film

Music

Soundtracks 
– 2013 She's the One (Film) (performer: "Don't Know What to Do, Don't Know What to Say")

– 2013 Four Sisters and a Wedding (Film) (performer: "Salamat")

– 2012 Sarah G Live (TV Series) (performer – 1 episode)

– Robi Domingo/Richard Yap/K Brosas/Ate Gay/Kedebon Colim/Cacai Bautista/Bb. Gandanghari (2012) ... (performer: "The Way You Look Tonight")

– 2012 Be Careful with My Heart (TV Series) (performer – 1 episode)

– Maya Is Determined to Chase Her Dreams (2012) ... (performer: "Please Be Careful with My Heart")

Awards and nominations

Politics
Yap was a candidate for representative of Cebu City's north district in the 2019 elections. Running under BARUG-PDP–Laban, he failed to unseat the incumbent Raul del Mar. Yap finished second out of four candidates.

Yap ran once again for the same congressional seat in the 2022 elections under the National Unity Party but did not win.

Personal life
Yap was born and raised in Cebu City. He graduated from Sacred Heart School in Cebu and then to De La Salle University for College. Coming from a family who loves to cook, Yap aspired a to be chef in his younger years. He owns/co-founded several food businesses, such as a gastropub and Asian cuisine restaurant.

In 1993, he married Melody Yap, with whom he has two children, Ashley and Dylan.

References

External links 

https://www.gmanetwork.com/sparkle/artists/richardyap

Living people
Male actors from Cebu
Filipino people of Chinese descent
Filipino Roman Catholics
Star Music artists
21st-century Filipino male singers
Filipino actors of Chinese descent
People from Cebu City
De La Salle University alumni
ABS-CBN personalities
GMA Network personalities
1967 births
Cebuano male models
21st-century Cebuano male singers